Aquilla may refer to:

Places
United States 
 Aquilla, Alabama, an unincorporated community in Washington County, Alabama
 Aquilla, Missouri
 Aquilla, Ohio
 Aquilla, Texas

Other uses 
 Aquilla, a character in the wargame Heroscape

See also
 Aquila (disambiguation)